HMS Unrivalled (P45) was a U-class submarine built for the Royal Navy during World War II. The boat has been the only ship of the Royal Navy to ever bear the name Unrivalled. Completed in 1942, the boat spent most of the war in the Mediterranean. She sank a number of small merchant ships and naval auxiliaries, but major success eluded her during the war. Too small and slow for the post-war environment, Unrivalled was scrapped in 1946.

Design and description
HMS Unrivalled was one of the second group of U-class submarines ordered on 23 August 1940. These submarines differed from their predecessors in that they were lengthened by  "to give a more streamlined shape aft and to improve the flow of water over the propellers."

Unrivalled had a single hull with internal ballast tanks and had a draft of  when surfaced. She displaced  while submerged, but only  on the surface. The submarine was equipped with two diesel engines and twin General Electric electric motors—for surfaced and submerged running, respectively. They were coupled together with a diesel-electric transmission.

HMS Unrivalled was equipped with four  bow torpedo tubes and could carry eight torpedoes. The submarine was also armed with a  QF Mk I gun deck gun. She had a crew of 33 men.

Career

HMS Unrivalled was ordered on 23 August 1940 as part of the 1940 naval construction programme from Vickers-Armstrong at Barrow-in-Furness. She was laid down on 12 May 1941, launched on 16 February 1942 and commissioned on 3 May 1942.

Apart from a work-up patrol in the Norwegian Sea, she spent the bulk of the war in the Mediterranean. While working up, Unrivalled fired a torpedo at what was thought to be a submerged enemy submarine. Only the periscope was sighted, and the torpedo was fired in the direction detected by the hydrophones, but no German submarine was in the area. Whilst in service in the Mediterranean, she sank a number of small merchantmen and small naval auxiliary vessels with both torpedoes and gunfire. These included the Italian auxiliary submarine chaser O 97 / Margherita, the Italian merchants Maddalena, Mostaganem and Pasubio, the Italian tugs Genova and Iseo, the Italian sailing vessels Triglav, Albina, Margherita, Sparviero and Ardito, the German auxiliary submarine chasers UJ 2201/Bois Rose and UJ 2204/Boréal, the Italian tanker Bivona, the small Italian merchant Santa Mariana Salina, the Italian auxiliary minesweeper R 172 / Impero and the small Italian vessel San Francisco di Paola A.

During Operation Husky in July 1943, she was stationed offshore to mark the landing beaches for the 1st Canadian Infantry Division. The boat survived the war, but was too slow for requirements and was not retained after the war. She was scrapped at Briton Ferry, Wales, beginning on 22 January 1946.

Notes

References

External links
 
 

 

British U-class submarines
Ships built in Barrow-in-Furness
1942 ships
World War II submarines of the United Kingdom